De Marsummermolen  is a smock mill in Marsum, Friesland, Netherlands which was built in 1903. The mill has been restored to working order and is used as a training mill. It is listed as a Rijksmonument, number 28624.

History
De Marssummermolen was built in 1903 by millwright J H Westra of Franeker. The mill can drain the polder, or pump water into the polder, or pump water in a closed circuit. Restorations were undertaken in 1976, and 1992–94. It is used as a training mill, and was the first mill in Friesland to be designated as such. A further restoration was undertaken in 2000. The mill is licensed as a venue for weddings.

Description

De Marsummermolen is what the Dutch describe as a Grondzeiler. It is a two-storey smock mill on a single-storey base. There is no stage, the sails reaching almost to ground level. The mill is winded by tailpole and winch. The smock and cap are thatched. The sails are Patent sails. The sails are carried on a cast-iron windshaft. which was cast by De Muinck Keizer, Martenshoek, Groningen in 1903. The windshaft also carries the brake wheel which has 57 cogs. This drives the wallower (31 cogs) at  the top of the upright shaft. At the bottom of the upright shaft there are two crown wheels''' The upper crown wheel, which has 17 cogs drives an Archimedes' screw. This screw is used to pump water into the polder. The lower crown wheel, which has 43 cogs, drives a gearwheel with 38 cogs on the axle of an Archimedes' screw, which is used to drain the polder. The screw is  diameter. It is inclined at 17°. Each revolution of the screw lifts  of water.

Public accessDe Marsummermolen'' is open to the public on Saturdays from 09:00 to 12:00, or by appointment.

References

Windmills in Friesland
Windmills completed in 1903
Smock mills in the Netherlands
Windpumps in the Netherlands
Rijksmonuments in Friesland
Octagonal buildings in the Netherlands